Cheru (also Romanized as Cherū; also known as Chervī) is a village in Tabas Rural District, in the Central District of Khoshab County, Razavi Khorasan Province, Iran. At the 2006 census, its population was 653, in 204 families.

References 

Populated places in Khoshab County